In linear algebra, an idempotent matrix is a matrix which, when multiplied by itself, yields itself. That is, the matrix  is idempotent if and only if . For this product  to be defined,  must necessarily be a square matrix. Viewed this way, idempotent matrices are idempotent elements of matrix rings.

Example
Examples of  idempotent matrices are:

Examples of  idempotent matrices are:

Real 2 × 2 case
If a matrix  is idempotent, then
 
  implying  so  or 
  implying  so  or 
 

Thus, a necessary condition for a  matrix to be idempotent is that either it is diagonal or its trace equals 1.
For idempotent diagonal matrices,  and  must be either 1 or 0.

If , the matrix  will be idempotent provided  so a satisfies the quadratic equation
 or 

which is a circle with center (1/2, 0) and radius 1/2. In terms of an angle θ,
 is idempotent.

However,  is not a necessary condition: any matrix

Properties

Singularity and regularity
The only non-singular idempotent matrix is the identity matrix; that is, if a non-identity matrix is idempotent, its number of independent rows (and columns) is less than its number of rows (and columns).

When an idempotent matrix is subtracted from the identity matrix, the result is also idempotent. This holds since

If a matrix  is idempotent then for all positive integers n, . This can be shown using proof by induction. Suppose that . Then, since  is idempotent. Hence by the principle of induction, the result follows.

Eigenvalues
An idempotent matrix is always diagonalizable. Its eigenvalues are either 0 or 1: if  is a non-zero eigenvector of some idempotent matrix  and  its associated eigenvalue, then  which implies  This further implies that the determinant of an idempotent matrix is always 0 or 1. As stated above, if the determinant is equal to one, the matrix is invertible and is therefore the identity matrix.

Trace
The trace of an idempotent matrix — the sum of the elements on its main diagonal — equals the rank of the matrix and thus is always an integer. This provides an easy way of computing the rank, or alternatively an easy way of determining the trace of a matrix whose elements are not specifically known (which is helpful in statistics, for example, in establishing the degree of bias in using a sample variance as an estimate of a population variance).

Relationships between idempotent matrices 
In regression analysis, the matrix  is known to produce the residuals  from the regression of the vector of dependent variables  on the matrix of covariates . (See the section on Applications.) These results play a key role, for example, in the derivation of the F test.

Any similar matrices of an idempotent matrix are also idempotent. Idempotency is conserved under a change of basis. This can be shown through multiplication of the transformed matrix  with  being idempotent: .

Applications
Idempotent matrices arise frequently in regression analysis and econometrics. For example, in ordinary least squares, the regression problem is to choose a vector  of coefficient estimates so as to minimize the sum of squared residuals (mispredictions) ei: in matrix form,
 Minimize 

The resulting estimator is

where superscript T indicates a transpose, and the vector of residuals is

Here both  and (the latter being known as the hat matrix) are idempotent and symmetric matrices, a fact which allows simplification when the sum of squared residuals is computed:

The idempotency of  plays a role in other calculations as well, such as in determining the variance of the estimator .

An idempotent linear operator  is a projection operator on the range space  along its null space .  is an orthogonal projection operator if and only if it is idempotent and symmetric.

See also
 Idempotence
 Nilpotent
 Projection (linear algebra)
 Hat matrix

References

Algebra
Regression analysis
Matrices